Yi Tjoune (December 18, 1859 – July 14, 1907), also known as Yi Jun (이준), was a Korean prosecutor and diplomat and the father of the North Korean politician Lee Yong.

Early life and education

Yi Tjoune was born in Bukcheong in the province of South Hamgyong and later worked as a judge in Seoul.

Career

In 1907 he and his compatriots Sangsul Yi and Tjyongoui Yi were delegated by Emperor Gojong to attend the Second Hague Peace Conference in The Hague. He was commissioned to announce to the international community that Korea was an independent state and that the Japanese invasion was unlawful. The trio traveled for two months on the Trans-Siberian Railway to The Hague. The Korean delegation was not officially invited, although the Netherlands initially had planned. However, the Japanese government was able to step in and succeeded in convincing the other delegates of the conference not to let Korea participate. A few days after Yi Tjoune protested against the decision, he was found dead in his room at the Hotel De Jong in the Wagenstraat, the Hague. His cause of death is unknown, but in South Korea it is assumed that he committed suicide due to the rejection by the international community. In time, however, Japanese newspapers suggested that he was killed by Japanese spies.

The mission had already failed. However, the three Koreans succeeded in receiving worldwide attention due to a press conference and receiving attention in an independent newspaper which covered the Peace Conference. The direct result of their mission was that the Korean Emperor, Gojong was forced to resign in favor of his son Sunjong.

Legacy

Yi was buried at the Nieuw Eykenduynen cemetery in The Hague.  His remains were exhumed on September 26, 1963 and transferred to South Korea and there solemnly reburied. A grand memorial has been established in 1977 at the place where his grave was. On several occasions postage stamps were issued by North Korea (DPRK) honoring Yi Jun. 

The former hotel De Jong, where Yi died, is since 1995 the Yi Jun Peace Museum, a private museum in memory of Yi Tjoune and dedicated to the promotion of peace. The museum was founded by a South Korean businessman Lee Kee-Hang and his wife Song Chang-ju.

See also

Hague Secret Emissary Affair

References

1907 suicides
19th-century Korean people
Hague Conventions of 1899 and 1907
1859 births
Suicides in the Netherlands
Jeonju Yi clan
1907 deaths